Kamal Foroughi (born 3 September 1939) is a British-Iranian businessman who was imprisoned in Evin Prison in Tehran, Iran. Iranian authorities arrested him in May 2011 while he was living in Tehran as a consultant for the Malaysian national oil and gas company Petronas. In 2013, he was sentenced to eight years in prison, seven for espionage and an additional year for possessing alcohol in his home.

Bio
Foroughi moved to Britain from Iran in the 1970s. He has two children from his ex-wife, an Irish/English National, Elizabeth Foroughi (née UNKNOWN), whom he divorced in the mid to late eighties in a contentious divorce during which, “The Court of Appeals of the United Kingdom of Great Britain and Northern Ireland on the 2nd of November 1990, in exchange for relinquishment of claim over any and all assets, domestic and foreign, awarded her a sum of £875,000.00.”, she spent a great deal of time in the matrimonial home in the Cadogen Square flats, in the Knightsbridge section of London, with the two children at boarding school.  During this time, Foroughi met and fell in love with his second wife.  They had a small ceremony where both were wed.  Foroughi has two granddaughters from his eldest and only son.  They all live in the UK.

Arrest and imprisonment in Iran
On 14 October 2015, The Guardian reported for the first time that Foroughi, a "76-year-old British national has been held in an Iranian jail for more than four years and convicted of spying." His family chose to publicly speak out years after his arrest in order to "draw attention to the plight of a man they describe as one of the 'oldest and loneliest prisoners in Iran.'"

Iranian plain clothes authorities arrested Foroughi on 5 May 2011. They "apparently did not show an arrest warrant or explain to him the reasons for arrest." At the time, he was working in Tehran as a consultant for the Malaysian national oil and gas company Petronas. They jailed him in Evin Prison, "where he was held in solitary confinement for periods of time, without access to a lawyer or his family." In 2013, Foroughi was sentenced to eight years in prison, seven for espionage and an additional year for possessing alcohol in his home. His son Kamran said, "My dad’s detention has been a total nightmare for all the family… We are not aware of any evidence that justifies the espionage charge."

Calls for release
On 11 December 2015, The Daily Telegraph and The Independent reported that UK Prime Minister David Cameron had personally written to the President of Iran, Hassan Rouhani, requesting the release of Foroughi. During a visit to Tehran in August 2015, UK Foreign Secretary Philip Hammond also raised the case of Foroughi with Rouhani.

Release from prison
He was released from detention in late 2018 but was unable to return to his family in Britain as he waited for his Iranian passport to be renewed. On 1 April 2020, the British Foreign and Commonwealth Office said in a statement that he had returned to the United Kingdom.

See also
 List of foreign nationals detained in Iran
 Nazanin Zaghari-Ratcliffe
 Ghoncheh Ghavami
 Hostage diplomacy

References

Living people
Iranian emigrants to the United Kingdom
Iranian prisoners and detainees
British people imprisoned in Iran
1939 births
Inmates of Evin Prison
Iranian businesspeople
British businesspeople